The County of Geneva, largely corresponding to the later Genevois province, originated in the tenth century, in the Burgundian Kingdom of Arles (Arelat) which fell to the Holy Roman Empire in 1032.

History
Several nobles had held the title of a Count of Geneva in Upper Burgundy (Bourgogne transjurane) from the 9th century. The progenitor of the Counts of Geneva was Conrad I, possible count palatine of Burgundy, in Vienne. Count Cono/Conrad died about 1003 in exile, during the Hermann II's rebellion (his brother duke of Swabia, of Conradines lineage). Their son, Robert, count of Geneva, was born about 970 and died about 1020. 

The county never played a major part as a feudal entity. The city of Geneva and its environs were retained, but the approaches to the western end of Lake Geneva, which had made the position strategic, were soon lost. In 1124, the Bishops of Geneva had their rule over the city acknowledged and continued to make themselves an independent force, while the Counts of Savoy encircled the territory and controlled the trade routes. From 1219 on, the counts' stronghold and capital was Annecy.

At a moment when the male line of the counts was near exhaustion, Robert of Geneva was raised to a shadow papacy by the French cardinals who seceded from the College of Cardinals and wished to rescind their part in the election of the irascible Urban VI; elected 20 September 1378, Robert took the title of Clement VII. Unexpectedly, with the death of his brother, he succeeded as count in 1392. As count, Robert was virtually dependent on the cooperative graces of the count of Savoy. With his death in 1394, the House of Geneva was extinguished and the title passed to the husband of the heiress, Humbert VII of Thoire and Villars who died in 1400.

Eventually in 1401, the year after Humbert's death, his heir Odo of Thoire-Geneva sold the comté to Count Amadeus VIII of Savoy. Though other members of the Genevan House protested, and the House of Chalons (and, after its extinction, the House of Orange-Nassau) remained the strongest claimant, Amadeus successfully completed the integration of the county with his territories, which were raised to a duchy by Emperor Sigismund of Luxembourg. The title Count of Geneva passed securely into the House of Savoy, where it is maintained as a courtesy title.

List of counts

Legendary counts
Medieval historians connected the literary figures of Reynier and Olivier from the late-12th-century Girart de Vienne to the Genevois, but this is pure fiction.
 c. 770 : Reynier
 c. 770–800 : Oliver, his son

Early counts
 c. 890 : Manasses, may be count of Geneva
 ...
 c. 1002 : Manasses
 c. 1012 : Robert, his nephew, son of count Cono/Conrad I (possible Cono count palatine of Burgundy)

Unconfirmed counts
By Samuel Guichenon, in Histoire généalogique de la royale maison de Savoie (1660)

 880 (?) : Ratbert (870/880 – † 901) 
 931 (?) : Albitius (900 – † 931/932), his son
 (?) : Conrad (930 – †  963), his son 
 c. 963–974 (?) : Robert († 974), his son 
 974–1001 (?) : Albert 
 1004 (?) : Renaud 
 1016 (?) : Aymon 
 c. 1060 : Robert

House of Geneva
c. 1045–c.1061 : Gerold of Geneva
c. 1061–1080: Conrad, his son
c. 1080–1128 : Aymon I, his brother
1128–1178 : Amadeus I, his son
1178–1195 : William I his son
1195–1220 : Humbert I, his son
1220–1252 : William II, his brother
1252–1265 : Rudolf, his son
1265–1280 : Aymon II, his son
1280–1308 : Amadeus II, his brother
1308–1320 : William III, his son
1320–1367 : Amadeus III, his son
1367–1367 : Aymon III, his son
1367–1369 : Amadeus IV, his brother
1369–1370 : John I, his brother
1370–1392 : Peter, his brother
1392–1394 : Robert, his brother as Clement VII he was Antipope at Avignon from 1378

House of Thoire

 1394–1400 : Humbert VII of Thoire and Villars (died 1400), son of Humbert VI, Lord of Thoire and Villars, and Maria of Geneva, daughter of Amadeus III
 1400–1401 : Odo of Thoire and Villars

In 1401, Odo sold the County to Amadeus VIII of Savoy. His heirs, however, contested this and the legal processes were not completed until 1424.

House of Savoy
From 1424 the County of Geneva was joined to the House of Savoy, although at times it was granted as appanage to cadet branches of the family.

 1424–1434 : Amadeus VIII, Duke of Savoy
 1434–1444 : Philip of Savoy (1417–1444), his son, apanagiste Count
 1444–1460 : Louis (1413–1465), Duke of Savoy, his brother
 1460–1482 : Louis (1436 † 1482), his son, apanagiste Count, also King of Cyprus
 1482–1491 : John of Savoy (1440–1491), his brother, apanagiste Count
 1491–1496 : Charles II (1489–1496), Duke of Savoy
 1496–1497 : Philipp II the Landless (1438–1497), Duke of Savoy, great-uncle of the previous, son of Louis I
 1497–1504 : Philibert II the Handsome (1480–1504), Duke of Savoy, his son
 1504–1514 : Charles III (1486–1553), Duke of Savoy, his brother
 1514–1533 : Philippe, Duke of Nemours (1490 † 1533), apanagiste Count of Geneva, Duke of Nemours, his brother
 1533–1585 : Jacques, Duke of Nemours (1531–1585), Duke of Geneva 1564, his son
 1585–1595 : Charles Emmanuel, Duke of Nemours (1567–1595), his son
 1595–1632 : Henri I, Duke of Nemours (1572–1632), his brother
 1632–1641 : Louis, Duke of Nemours (1615–1641), his son
 1641–1652 : Charles Amadeus of Savoy (1624–1652), his brother
 1652–1659 : Henri II, Duke of Nemours (1625–1659), his brother, Archbishop of Reims
 1659–1724 : Marie Jeanne of Savoy (1644–1724), daughter of Charles Amadeus, married
 Charles Emmanuel II, Duke of Savoy (1634–1675) husband of the above

Subsequently, the County of Geneva was joined to the Duchy of Savoy.

References

Further reading
Duparc, Pierre, Le Comté de Genève, Ixe-XVe siècle (Geneva and Paris) 1955.

 
Lists of swiss noble titles
Geneva
10th-century establishments in Europe
1401 disestablishments in Europe
10th-century establishments in the Holy Roman Empire